The 2019 Mundialito de Clubes was the sixth edition of the Mundialito de Clubes (Club World Cup in English), a biennial international club beach soccer competition contested between top men's clubs from across the world.

Organised by Beach Soccer Worldwide (BSWW), the competition took place outside of Brazil for the first time – this edition was hosted in Moscow, Russia between February 27 and March 3, featuring eight clubs. The competition was originally due to take place in São Sebastião, Brazil from 13–16 December 2018. However, in November, due to difficulties coordinating with local authorities, BSWW postponed the event until February 2019 and ultimately moved its location to Europe.

Lokomotiv Moscow of Russia were the defending champions but were knocked out in the group stage, ultimately finishing seventh. The tournament was won, for the first time, by Braga of Portugal.

Teams
Despite the competition's title of Club World Cup, in reality, this edition only saw two continents represented: Europe and South America. Additionally, the former dominated the line-up with seven clubs entering. Overall, the eight clubs represented six different countries.

Russian league champions Kristall were originally confirmed to participate when the competition was scheduled for December 2018. But due to a calendar clash, they pulled out when the tournament was pushed back to February.

Squads

Venue

One venue is used in the city of Moscow, Russia.
The Megasport Sport Palace in Khodynka Field with a capacity of approximately 13,000 hosted all the matches. This is an indoor arena.

Draw
The draw to split the eight teams into two groups of four took place at BSWW headquarters in Barcelona at 16:00 GMT on February 14.

For the purpose of the draw, the clubs were split into two pots of four. Initially, two clubs in Pot 1 were seeded and automatically assigned to the groups.

to Group A: as the host club,  Spartak Moscow
to Group B: as the defending champions,  Lokomotiv Moscow

The remaining two clubs from Pot 1 were then drawn out; the first was placed into Group A and the second was placed into Group B. The four clubs from Pot 2 were then drawn out; the placement of the clubs alternated back and forth between Groups A and B as each was drawn. Two clubs from the same country could not be placed into the same group.

Group stage

Group A

Group B

5th-8th place play-offs

Seventh place play-off

Fifth place play-off

Knockout stage

Semi-finals

Third place play-off

Final

Awards

Final standings

References

External links
Mundialito de Clubes Moscow, at Beach Soccer Worldwide
Club Mundialito 2019, at Beach Soccer Russia (in Russian)

2019
2019
Beach soccer in Russia
2019 in beach soccer
2019 in Russian sport
February 2019 sports events in Russia
March 2019 sports events in Russia